Gerontechnology is an inter- and multidisciplinary academic and professional field combining gerontology and technology. Sustainability of an aging society depends upon our effectiveness in creating technological environments, including assistive technology and inclusive design, for innovative and independent living and social participation of older adults in any state of health, comfort and safety. In short, gerontechnology concerns matching technological environments to health, housing, mobility, communication, leisure and work of older people. Gerontechnology is most frequently identified as a subset of HealthTech and is more commonly referred to as AgeTech in Europe and the United States. Research outcomes form the basis for designers, builders, engineers, manufacturers, and those in the health professions (nursing, medicine, gerontology, geriatrics, environmental psychology, developmental psychology, etc.), to provide an optimum living environment for the widest range of ages.

Description 
Gerontechnology, also called gerotechnology, is considered an adjunct to the promotion of human health and well-being. It pertains to both human development and aging with the aim to compress morbidity and to increase vitality and quality of life throughout the lifespan. It creates solutions to extend the working phase in society by maximizing the vital and productive years in the later years of life, which consequently reduces the cost of care.

The overall framework of gerontechnology may be seen as a matrix of domains of human activity: (1) health & self-esteem, housing & activities of daily living, communication & governance, mobility & transport, work & leisure, as well as (2) technology interventions or impact levels (enhancement & satisfaction, prevention & engagement, compensation & assistance, care and care organisation). Underpinning all these elements are generic and applied evidence-based research. Such research supports the development of products and services.

Gerontechnology has much in common with other interdisciplinary domains, such as Assistive Technology (for the compensation & assistance and the care support & care organisation rows of the matrix), and Universal Design for the development of all products and services pertaining to gerontechnology.

Gerontological design 
Gerontological design focuses on providing effective solutions to improve the way of life for ageing people, through gerontological knowledge and design research methods to obtain a better understanding of individuals' preferences and requirements.

Gerontological design also refers specifically to the study and practice of building design methods that support elderly users in the built environment.  Some universities host professors, commonly in architecture or interior design departments, that specialize in the study and teaching of this design specialization.  Not only does this include the examination of building design characteristics that impact older adults' physiological well-being, but it can also include the investigation of building design characteristics that impact informational needs (i.e. finding one's way around in a space) or social interaction needs (Campbell, 2012).

Between 2008 and 2030, Singapore will witness an age profile shift in its population's history. In 2005, one in 12 residents was 65 years or older. By 2030, one in five residents will be 65 years or older.  Studies show that in 2002, 7% of the world's population is aged 65 and above. By 2050, it is envisaged that the percentage could rise to nearly 17%. The ageing population and its impact on economics, politics, education and lifestyle is no longer an isolated issue but a global concern. Products and services relevant to the "silver industry" or the "mature market" increasingly abound in the marketplace. The demand for designers with a keen sense for the aging population's needs who employ gerontological design process knowledge concomitantly rises.

Publications 
An international academic journal with delayed open-access, Gerontechnology , is published by the International Society for Gerontechnology (ISG) .

A comprehensive edited book "Gerontechnology"  has been published in 2016.

Applications 
Age technology (AgeTech) has been used to enhance aspects of insurance, domiciliary care, residential and nursing homes, health care, and risk management. The services may originate from various independent service providers or the interconnection of devices and services enabled through open APIs. Commercial businesses with an ageing component including the opportunities around the “Silver Economy” – providing services for the ‘wants’ of the older demographic, supporting independent living – addressing the ‘needs’ of the older demographic, longevity – extending healthy lifespan and geroscience.

In the US, startup Aging2.0 launched in 2015 and has since organized 170 meet-up events, opened volunteer chapters in 30 countries and signed up 30 companies for its own accelerator program. Amongst these, SingFit “makes it easy for everyone to become a music therapist”, WalkJoy is a wearable sensor that measures a person’s gait and alerts caregivers when someone could be about to fall. Active Protective is a personal airbag that inflates to stop someone breaking their hip. And Vynca records a person’s dying wishes, so families aren’t unsure when the time comes. The company Honor, which connects seniors, caregivers and their families, recently raised $20 million, the biggest funding in the emerging category so far. In Europe, London-based AgeTech startup Birdie secured a €7 million Series A to help elderly adults live independently while independent living system Kraydel has raised over £1m in innovation and public sector grants to develop its smart device which sits on top of the TV, linking elderly people to their carers or family members, through their TV screens.

Education 
 The first ISG Masterclass  for PhD students in 2006 produced a scheme to support gerontechnological research.

See also 
 Gero-Informatics
 Gerontology
 Biomechatronics

References

External links 
 The International Society for Gerontechnology (ISG)
 The official LinkedIn discussion group of ISG
 Gero-tech
 Aging and Accessible Technology
 MIT AgeLab
 Center for Aging Services Technologies (CAST)
 IMIA Working Group on Smart Homes and Ambient Assisted Living
 Gerontological Society of America: Formal Interest Group on Technology & Aging
 Active and Assisted Living Programme
 Indiana University Gero-informatics Program
 GGT Deutsche Gesellschaft fuer Gerontotechnik – GGT German Society of Gerontechnology
 FIK research program implemented by Tecnalia Research & Innovation
 Technical Research Centre for Dependency Care and Autonomous Living (CETpD) created by the UPC and Fundació Hospital Comarcal Sant Antoni Abat.
 Gerontechnologie.net The French web portal about Gerontechnology.

Ageing
Gerontology
Technology